Noël van 't End (born 15 June 1991) is a Dutch judoka.

He competed at the 2016 Summer Olympics in Rio de Janeiro, in the men's 90 kg.

In 2021, he won the gold medal in his event at the 2021 Judo World Masters held in Doha, Qatar.

He holds a black belt.

References

External links

 
 
 

1991 births
Living people
Dutch male judoka
Olympic judoka of the Netherlands
Judoka at the 2016 Summer Olympics
World judo champions
People from Houten
European Games competitors for the Netherlands
Judoka at the 2019 European Games
Judoka at the 2020 Summer Olympics
20th-century Dutch people
21st-century Dutch people
Sportspeople from Utrecht (province)